Gutenbach may refer to:

 Gütenbach, a municipality in Baden-Württemberg, Germany
 Gutenbach (Appelbach), a river of Rhineland-Palatinate, Germany, tributary of the Appelbach
 Gutenbach (Sulzach), a river of Bavaria, Germany, tributary of the Sulzach
 Gutenbach (Wildenbach), a river of North Rhine-Westphalia, Germany, tributary of the Wildenbach